Simon Nicholas Warley (born 6 January 1972) is an English solicitor and former first-class cricketer.

Warley was born at Sittingbourne in January 1972. He later studied at Oriel College at the University of Oxford. While studying at Oxford, he played first-class cricket for Oxford University in 1991 and 1992, making nine appearances against county opposition. Warley scored 132 runs in his nine matches, at an average of 12.00 and a high score of 35.

Warley was a Labour Party councillor on Canterbury City Council for the Westgate Ward, before losing his seat in the 2019 Canterbury City Council election. By profession he is a solicitor, having been admitted to practice in 1997.

References

External links

1972 births
Living people
People from Sittingbourne
Alumni of Oriel College, Oxford
English cricketers
Oxford University cricketers
Labour Party (UK) councillors